Bandar Permaisuri is a small town and the capital of Setiu District, Terengganu, Malaysia old capital of Terengganu.

Climate
Bandar Permaisuri has a tropical rainforest climate (Af) with heavy to very heavy rainfall year-round.

References

Setiu District
Towns in Terengganu